Fadeli (16 July 1955 – 8 May 2021) was an Indonesian politician. He was regent of Lamongan from 2010 to 2015 and from 2016 to 2021.

References

1955 births
2021 deaths
Indonesian politicians
Mayors and regents of places in East Java
Democratic Party (Indonesia) politicians
People from Lamongan Regency